Stol (also Veliki Stol) or Hochstuhl, at , is the highest mountain of the Karawanks and straddles the border between Slovenia and Austria.

Etymology
The Slovene name Veliki Stol, meaning 'great chair', is derived from the visual appearance of the mountain, especially when seen from the east. The German name Hochstuhl ('high chair'), was not introduced until the late 19th century. In previous times, the German designation was Stou, a phonetic derivation of the Slovene name.

Geography
The Stol massif stretches from Žirovnica in Slovenia to the Austrian market town of Feistritz im Rosental in the north. The summit is part of the Karawanks main ridge and the watershed between the Sava and Drava rivers. In the north, the Dachstein limestone rocks fall steeply to an over  depth. 

In the east, the crest of the Karawanks leads to Mt. Vrtača and further down to Loibl Pass.

Ascent

The first ascent of the mountain was made on 17 August 1794 by the Carniolan count and mountaineer Franz von Hohenwart (1771–1844) following an invitation from Sigmund Zois (1747–1819). On 9 September 1906 two climbers first reached the Stol peak via the steep north face. A first mountain hut south of the summit was erected by the Austrian Tourist Club in 1883 and called Valvasor Refuge. The Stou Refuge north of the main ridge was opened by the German and Austrian Alpine Club in 1886.

Today there are numerous routes to the summit from Feistritz on the Austrian side via the Klagenfurt Lodge (Klagenfurter Hütte), built in 1906, as well as routes from Žirovnica in Slovenia, where the Prešeren Lodge (Prešernova koča), opened in 1910, stands below the secondary peak of Mali Stol. Both refuges were burned down during World War II by Yugoslav partisans to prevent them from being used as base camps by Wehrmacht soldiers. The Klagenfurt Lodge re-opened in 1952 with 24 berths and a dormitory (Matratzenlager); the Prešeren Lodge was rebuilt in 1966, it is nowadays open from mid-June to mid-September. It has 45 berths, a washroom, and two dining rooms with a seating capacity of 80.

The ascent of the 500 m steep slope on the north face of the mountain is climbed by a via ferrata (Klettersteig) built by the Austrian Alpine Club in 1966/67, the use of which requires some mountaineering skills.

Gallery

References

External links 

 Photos, Route and Description

Mountains of the Alps
Mountains of Upper Carniola
Landforms of Austria
Austria–Slovenia border
International mountains of Europe
Karawanks
Two-thousanders of Austria
Ridges of Slovenia
Two-thousanders of Slovenia